Denis Kovalevich (born 29 March 2003) is a Belarusian professional footballer, who plays for Shakhtyor Petrikov.

References

External links 
 
 

2003 births
Living people
Belarusian footballers
Association football midfielders
FC Dynamo Brest players
FC Rukh Brest players
FC Shakhtyor Petrikov players